Georgy Ivanovich Firtich (October 20, 1938 – January 27, 2016) was a Soviet and Russian composer, jazz pianist, professor Herzen University. Honored Art Worker the Russian Federation

Born in Pskov. He graduated from the School of Music by Rimsky-Korsakov (class composition) and Saint Petersburg Conservatory  (1962, class of Yuri Balkashin and Boris Arapov).

During his studies, he began performing as a pianist: school years with the performance of the classics and his own compositions, the school - as a jazz singer. At the undergraduate conservatory began writing for film (in this area has worked for almost 40 years). In 1962 he joined the Union  Composers of USSR. Since 1994, led by ACM (Association for Contemporary Music), the Union of Composers of St. Petersburg. He died January 27, 2016, in St. Petersburg.

References

External links
 Georgy Firtich at the myzuka.org

1938 births
2016 deaths
Russian male composers
Soviet male composers
Russian film score composers
Soviet film score composers
Male film score composers
20th-century Russian male musicians